Fabian Charles Monds, CBE (born 1 November 1940) was a BBC Governor with responsibility for Northern Ireland. Appointed in 1999, in June 2003 his term of office was extended until 31 July 2007. He has contributed to economic development and inward investment initiatives, particularly in Londonderry, Fermanagh, Omagh and West Belfast.

Monds was director of the Institute of Mathematics, becoming Dean, and later, Pro-Vice Chancellor, of the Magee Campus of the University of Ulster. Until 2006, he was the Chairman of Invest Northern Ireland, the province's main economic development organisation. His research interests include telecommunications and entrepreneurial studies. He is Chair of Northern Ireland's Centre for Trauma and Transformation in Omagh, County Tyrone.  He is the former Northern Ireland co-chair of the U.S.-Ireland R&D Partnership Steering Group.

His grand daughter is the singer SOAK whose full name is Bridie Monds-Watson.

Career
 Emeritus Professor of Information Systems of University of Ulster.
 Founding partner of Medical and Scientific Computer Services Ltd., Lisburn
 Founding partner of WesternConnect Ltd., Londonderry

External links
BBC Website

References

1940 births
BBC Governors
Commanders of the Order of the British Empire
Living people
Academics from Northern Ireland
Businesspeople from Northern Ireland
Place of birth missing (living people)
People associated with Ulster University